Aglaia is a feminine given name that comes from the ancient Greek Grace Aglaia (Ἀγλαΐα). It may also be written Aglaïa or sometimes as Aglaja, Aglaya, or Aglaea.

People named Aglaia include:
 Aglaia Anastasiou (born 1986), Greek swimmer
 Aglaia Coronio (1834–1906), British embroiderer, bookbinder, and art collector
 Aglaia Konrad (born 1960), Austrian photographer and educator
 Aglaia Koras, Greek-American pianist
 Aglaia Kremezi, Greek food writer and journalist
 Aglaia Mortcheva (born 1972), Bulgarian animator, illustrator, voice actress, and professor
 Aglaia Papa (1904–1984), Greek painter
 Aglaia Pezzato (born 1994), Italian swimmer
 Aglaia Szyszkowitz (born 1968), Austrian actress
 Aglaja Brix (born 1990), German actress
 Aglaja Orgeni (1841–1926), Hungarian coloratura soprano
 Aglaja Schmid (1926–2003), Austrian stage and film actress
 Aglaja Veteranyi (1962–2002), Swiss writer
 Aglaya Tarasova (born 1994), Russian actress

In fiction 
 Aglaia, the wife of Karagiozis
 Aglaia or Aglaya Yepanchin, is the name of a character that features in Dostoyevsky's The Idiot, where she is the daughter of General Epanchin.